The Army Signal Command Cybernetic Security Unit is a cyber warfare unit of the Italian Army.

History 
The Initial Formation Team of the Army Signal Command Cybernetic Security Unit was established in September 2018. The Cybernetic Security Unit was established on 1 April 2019 and, on 20 June 2019, the Unit reached the Initial Operational Capability. On 30 June 2020, the Cybernetic Security Unit reached the full operational capability.

Mission 
The Cybernetic Security Unit performs:
 Cyber defence, together with the Task Force C4 of Theater;
 Information research, in support of G2/J2 cells;
 Cyber command staff and forensic operations in support of personnel, future operations and logistics cells, for planning cybernetic military operations and traditional military operations with effects in cyberspace;
 Other Cyber operations, according to the assigned tasks and missions.

The Cybernetic Security Unit is tasked with performing cyber operations related to the defence of IT networks and Command-and-Control systems, Operational Technology, for the protection of critical infrastructures and platforms and weapon systems and Disruptive Technology.

The Cybernetic Security Unit operates under the Network Operations Command (a joint command) alongside the Joint Telecommunications School. The Cybernetic Security Unit personnel also operates within both the cyber deployed operational units and the staff of the supported Command.

Organisation 
According to Defence Undersecretary Angelo Tofalo, the Army Signal Command Cybernetic Security Unit is framed under the command of the Signals Commander. The Unit, at battalion level, consists of two Cybernetic Security Companies and one Training and Innovation Section.

Emblem 
The coat of arms of the Army Signal Command Cybernetic Security Unit depicts Janus Bifrons.

The badge is in enameled metal, in the shape of a Samnite shield, with a silver-blue edge. In the middle, on a light blue background, Janus (parted per pale) is charged: in the first partition there is the human forehead in cornflower blue colour, in the second the cybernetic forehead covered by dark blue electronic circuit tracks. The 5-pointed gold star appears at the base of Janus.

All the elements of the badge are placed on a light blue background, a symbol of communication and an emblem of loyalty. The other elements that make up the badge are represented through shades of the same blue, while the score that represents the cybernetic front of the Janus is covered with veins similar to traces of an electronic printed circuit, symbol of the high technological level of the Unit.

See also 
 Comando Interforze per le Operazioni Cibernetiche
 List of cyber warfare forces
 Army Signal Command (Italy)

References 

Cyberwarfare
Army units and formations of Italy post-1946
Military units and formations established in 2019